Lion (released April 25, 2014 in Germany by the label ACT Music – ACT 9031-2) is the 5'th album of the Norwegian saxophonist Marius Neset, this time in collaboration with the Trondheim Jazz Orchestra.

Background 
Neset originally received a commission to compose for the orchestra in 2011 for a concert at the 2012 Moldejazz Festival. “After the premiere in Molde, these compositions felt so special that we decided to record this album and play many more concerts with it,” he comments.

Critical reception 

The All About Jazz reviewer John Kelman awarded the album 4,5 stars and the review by John Fordham of the British newspaper The Guardian awarded the album 4 stars, The Arts Desk reviewer Matthew Wright awarded the album 4 stars.

The London Jazz News critique Eric Ford, in his review of Neset's album Lion states:
<blockquote>... The flow between duo, trio, solo and all other sections is exceedingly well-orchestrated and just sweeps you along from one surprise to the next ...</blockquote>

 Track listing All compositions by Marius Neset''

Personnel 
 Marius Neset - tenor and soprano saxophones
 Hanna Paulsberg - tenor saxophone
 Peter Fuglsang - alto saxophone, flute and clarinet
 Eirik Hegdal - baritone and soprano saxophones
 Eivind Lønning - trumpet
 Erik Eilertsen - trumpet
 Erik Johannesen - trombone
 Daniel Herskedal - tuba
 Jovan Pavlovic - accordion
 Espen Berg - piano
 Petter Eldh - bass
 Gard Nilssen - drums, percussion, a.o.
 Ingrid Neset - additional flute and piccolo flute (tracks #05 and #08)

Credits 
 Music composed and arranged by Marius Neset
 Recorded by August Wanngren at The Village Recording, September 2013
 Mixed by August Wanngren at We Know Music Studios
 Mastered by Thomas Eberger at Stockholm Mastering
 Artwork by Siggi Loch & Jutta Stolte
 Front cover photo by Lutz Voigtländer
 Produced by Marius Neset and Trondheim Jazz Orchestra

References

External links 
Marius Neset website
Trondheim Jazz Orchestra website
”Lion” af Marius Neset on YouTube

Marius Neset albums
ACT Music albums
2014 albums
2014 in Norwegian music